Gary K. Shimokawa (born February 13, 1942) is an American director and producer.  He is best known for directing the sitcoms Archie Bunker's Place, Night Court and The Golden Girls.  He has directed and produced over 40 shows and movies.

Biography
Shimokawa was born in Los Angeles in 1942. He is of Japanese descent; he and his family were interned at Manzanar shortly after his birth following the attack on Pearl Harbor and signing of Executive Order 9066.

Before venturing into Hollywood films and TV, Shimokawa taught on the junior high and high school level in Los Angeles, and wrote on the Gardena Valley News, a local bi-weekly paper, as the Sports and Entertainment editor. In television, he has directed and produced shows for over 35 years (primarily half-hour multi-cam comedy shows for prime-time and cable) totaling over 600 episodes.  He also co-wrote a comedy pilot for Nickelodeon cable TV network. Shimowaka holds a Bachelor of Arts degree from University of Southern California (USC) in Comparative Literature.

Shimokawa also served as an adjunct professor at USC for two years in the graduate film and television program and was also an adjunct professor at LMU in undergraduate television. He presently serves as a visiting professor at New York University's Kanbar Institute of Film & Television.

Filmography

As director
Welcome Back, Kotter (1976); Ep. "A Love Story"
The Bay City Amusement Company (1977)
Laverne & Shirley (1977); Ep. "Honeymoon Hotel"
Another Day (1978); Ep. "A Couple Drinks With the Girls"
Fish (1978); 8 Episodes
Carter Country (1979); Ep. "The Russians Are Coming"
Alice (TV series) (1980); Ep. "Carrie's Wedding"
The Facts of Life (1980); Ep. "Molly's Holiday"
Archie Bunker's Place (1980–83); 25 Episodes
Mister T (1983–85); 30 Episodes
Night Court (1984–85); 2 Episodes
Down to Earth (1985); Ep. "Ethel's Memory Loss"
What's Happening Now!! (1985–88); 4 Episodes
Comedy Factory (1986); Ep. "Hearts of Steel"
The Golden Girls (1986); Ep. "Second Motherhood"
Sanchez of Bel Air (1986); 2 Episodes
Nine to Five (1987–88); 14 Episodes
ALF (1987–89); 13 Episodes
Good Morning, Miss Bliss (1988–89); 5 Episodes
Saved by the Bell (1989); 4 Episodes
Normal Life (1990); Ep. "And Baby Makes..."
Amen (1990–91); 3 Episodes
Big Brother Jake (1990–92); 2 Episodes
Sister, Sister (1995); Ep. "Christmas"
Coach (1996); Ep. "We Can Never Die"
Goode Behavior (1996); 23 Episodes
Quick Witz (1996); Ep. "Pilot"
USA High (1997); 3 Episodes
Malibu, CA (1998); 3 Episodes
Reba (2001); 3 Episodes
Titus (2001–02); 8 Episodes
One on One (2003); 4 Episodes
Eve (2004); 3 Episodes
Less Than Perfect (2004); Ep. "Claude's 15 Minutes of Christmas"
Still Standing (2005); Ep. "Still Mother's Day"
Cuts (2006); 2 Episodes
Sherri (2009); Ep. "Thanks-for-Not-for-Nothing-Giving"

As Associate/Second Unit Director
The Christmas Visit (1973)
All in the Family (1973–77); 65 Episodes
That's My Mama (1974); 3 Episodes
Good Times (1975); 13 Episodes
Welcome Back, Kotter (1975); Ep. "Welcome Back"
Dorothy (1979); 3 Episodes
The Facts of Life (1979–80); 3 Episodes
Archie Bunker's Place (1980–82); 3 Episodes
Night Court (1984–85); 28 Episodes
Hail to the Chief (1985); Ep. "Pilot"
The Golden Girls (1985–87); 39 Episodes
Amen (1986); Ep. "Pilot"

As producer
Mr. T and Tina (1976); 2 Episodes
Count Basie at Carnegie Hall (1981)
Living in TV Land (2006); Ep. "Sherman Hemsley"
Lies I Told My Little Sister (2014)

Miscellaneous
All in the Family (1972–73) as Stage Manager; 24 Episodes
The Joker's Wild (1972–75) as Stage Manager; All Episodes
The Actor's Journey (2011) as himself
The Actor's Journey for Kids (2011) as himself

References

External links

American television directors
Film producers from California
Television producers from California
American film directors of Japanese descent
Japanese-American internees
Living people
University of Southern California alumni
People from Los Angeles County, California
1942 births